Gavina may refer to:

 Chris Gavina (born 1979), Filipino professional basketball coach
 Francisco Gaviña Ribelles (1941-1990), Spanish chemist and politician for the Spanish Socialist Workers' Party
 Nuno Manuel Gavina do Couto (born 1969), Portuguese radio voice, producer and owner of OR2 Web Productions

 Gaviña Gourmet Coffee, a coffee importer and roaster located in Vernon, California
 Tagiades menaka gavina, a species of spread-winged skipper butterflies

See also 
 Gavini (disambiguation)